Botev Peak is a peak rising to about 370 m in the southern extremity of the Veleka Ridge of Tangra Mountains, eastern Livingston Island in the South Shetland Islands, Antarctica overlooking Tarnovo Ice Piedmont to the east-northeast, Botev Point to the south, Barnard Point to the west and Arkutino Beach to the northwest.  The feature takes its name from the adjacent Botev Point.

Location
The peak was mapped by Bulgaria in 2005 and 2009 and is registered in the SCAR Composite Antarctic Gazetteer.

Maps
 L.L. Ivanov et al. Antarctica: Livingston Island and Greenwich Island, South Shetland Islands. Scale 1:100000 topographic map. Sofia: Antarctic Place-names Commission of Bulgaria, 2005.
 L.L. Ivanov. Antarctica: Livingston Island and Greenwich, Robert, Snow and Smith Islands. Scale 1:120000 topographic map.  Troyan: Manfred Wörner Foundation, 2009.

References
 Botev Peak. SCAR Composite Gazetteer of Antarctica.
 Bulgarian Antarctic Gazetteer. Antarctic Place-names Commission. (details in Bulgarian, basic data in English)

External links
 Botev Peak. Copernix satellite image

Tangra Mountains